Son of Billy the Kid is a 1949 American Western film directed by Ray Taylor starring Lash LaRue. Produced by Ron Ormond, the film was co-written by Ormond's wife June Carr who also plays a lead role in the film. This film was not part of the 11-film Marshal Lash LaRue movie series, although it was made simultaneously with the series.

Plot
The film imagines Billy the Kid was not killed and successfully adopted another identity.

Jack Garrett, no relation to Pat Garrett, interrupts a stagecoach holdup.  He meets Fuzzy the town's stagecoach driver, station agent, baggage agent, Justice of the Peace, sheriff of the town and banker Jim Thorn.  The trio team up to prevent robberies of Thorn's bank by Clem Yantis's large gang.

Cast
Lash LaRue 	as Jack Garrett
Al St. John  	as Fuzzy 
June Carr  	as Betty Raines
 John James 	as Colt Thorn 
 Marion Colby 	as Norma Berry
 Bob Duncan 	as Clem Yantis
Terry Frost  	as Cy Shaeffer
 George Baxter 	as Jim Thorn
Clarke Stevens 	as Yantis henchman 
I. Stanford Jolley  	as Matt Fergus 
 Cliff Taylor 	as Jake
 William Perrott 	as Billy the Kid 
Rosa Turich  	as Rosa Gonzáles
 Jerry Riggio 	as Sanchos
Felipe Turich 	as José Gonzáles

References

External links

1949 films
1949 Western (genre) films
American Western (genre) films
Films about Billy the Kid
Films directed by Ray Taylor
Lippert Pictures films
1940s American films